Hannah Marshall is a New Zealand actress. She played Beth Wilson on Shortland Street and Loretta Schembri on Packed to the Rafters.

Marshall was nominated for the Logie Award for Most Popular New Female Talent in 2011 for her role in Packed to the Rafters.

Marshall is originally from Greenlane in Auckland and moved to Australia in 2007 to further her acting career.  Since 2014 Marshall has been based in Los Angeles, USA

Filmography

Film

Television

References

External links

 
 

Living people
21st-century New Zealand actresses
New Zealand emigrants to Australia
New Zealand expatriate actresses in the United States
1984 births
People from Auckland
New Zealand television actresses